Home Improvement is an American television sitcom starring Tim Allen, that aired on ABC from September 17, 1991, to May 25, 1999, with 204 approx. 22-minute episodes produced spanning 8 seasons.

Series overview

Episodes

Season 1 (1991–92)

Season 2 (1992–93)

Season 3 (1993–94)

Season 4 (1994–95)

Season 5 (1995–96)

Season 6 (1996–97)

Season 7 (1997–98)

Season 8 (1998–99)

References 

Lists of American sitcom episodes
Episodes